Louriza Tronco (born October 21, 1993) is a Canadian actress and singer who is best known for her starring role as Jodi Mappa in the Nickelodeon and YTV musical comedy Make It Pop and for portraying Yuki (sidekick) in the Disney Channel original movie, Zapped. She also played Andrea in Night at the Museum: Secret of the Tomb.

Biography

Tronco was born and raised in Winnipeg, Manitoba, Canada to Filipino immigrants. At age five, she started acting in a theater arts academy.  At age eight, she performed in Rainbow Stage's production of Joseph and the Amazing Technicolor Dreamcoat as part of the children's choir. In school she juggled dance competitions, school plays, and part-time jobs. At age 18, she graduated from high school and went to the Canadian College of Performing Arts in Victoria, British Columbia. While attending college six days a week, she regularly traveled to Vancouver for auditions.

After the two-year program, she moved to Vancouver to pursue her career full-time. She got her first break when she was cast in a guest appearance on The CW's Cult in 2013. She appeared in the Disney Channel's original movie Zapped. She also played Jodi Mappa on Make It Pop, a half Jewish dancer who is a freshman at Mackendrick Prep.

Filmography

References

External links

1993 births
Living people
Actresses from Winnipeg
Canadian actresses of Filipino descent
Canadian television actresses
Canadian film actresses